Heliozona dulla is a moth of the family Erebidae first described by Arnold Pagenstecher in 1886. It is found on the Kai Islands and Papua New Guinea.

References

Moths described in 1886
Spilosomina
Taxa named by Arnold Pagenstecher